The list of ship commissionings in 2017 includes a chronological list of all ships commissioned in 2017.


See also

References

2017